The 1878 Penn Quakers football team represented the University of Pennsylvania in the 1878 college football season. They finished with a 1–2–1 record.

Schedule

References

Penn
Penn Quakers football seasons
Penn Quakers football